Martha Rogers (born March 10, 1955) is an American author, customer strategist, and founding partner of Peppers & Rogers Group, a management consulting firm. Rogers is an adjunct professor at the Fuqua School of Business at Duke University and a co-director of the Duke Center for Customer Relationship Management.

Biography
Rogers graduated from Birmingham-Southern College in 1974 and earned her PhD at the University of Tennessee as a Bickel fellow.

Rogers has been published in academic and trade journals, including the Harvard Business Review, Journal of Advertising Research, and the Journal of Public Policy and Marketing.

Rogers has co-authored nine customer strategy books with Don Peppers. Peppers and Rogers are often credited with having launched the CRM revolution with their first book, The One to One Future: Building Relationships One Customer at a Time (1993).  Inc. Magazine managing editor George Gendron called this book "one of the two or three most important business books ever written", while Business Week called it the "bible of the new marketing".  In 2011, the authors released a second, updated edition of their textbook, Managing Customer Relationships: A Strategic Perspective.

In 2010, Rogers married television personality and talk show host Dick Cavett in New Orleans, Louisiana.

Bibliography
 Extreme Trust: Honesty as a Competitive Advantage, (2012) 
 Managing Customer Relationships: A Strategic Framework (2nd ed., 2011) 
 Rules to Break and Laws to Follow (2008) 
 Return on Customer (2005) 
 One to One B2B (2001) 
 The One to One Fieldbook (1999)  
 The One to One Manager (1999)  
 Enterprise One to One (1997) 
 The One to One Future (1993)

References

American women academics
20th-century American women writers
Duke University faculty
Living people
American marketing people
1955 births
University of Tennessee alumni
American business writers
Women business writers
American women non-fiction writers
20th-century American non-fiction writers
21st-century American women